Tereza Melecká (born 17 June 1998) is a Czech professional golfer and Ladies European Tour player. She won the 2022 Aramco Team Series – Sotogrande team event together with Jessica Korda and Noora Komulainen.

Early life and amateur career
Melecká was born in Šternberk and became a member of the Czech National Team, representing her country in two European Girls' Team Championship and five consecutive European Ladies' Team Championships between 2015 and 2021.

In 2017, she won the Czech National Match Play Championship.

Melecká enrolled at East Tennessee State University in 2017 and joined the East Tennessee State Buccaneers women's golf team, where she won six tournaments and was Southern Conference Player of the Year in 2021. She graduated in May 2021 with a degree in Business Marketing.

She was runner up at the Czech Ladies Challenge in 2018 and 2019, and the Montauban Ladies Open in 2021. She was the best Czech player on the World Amateur Golf Rankings in 2020 and her best position was 47th.

Professional career
Melecká turned professional in 2021 and earned LET status at Q-School in December. 

In her rookie season, she won the 2022 Aramco Team Series – Sotogrande team event in Spain together with Jessica Korda, Noora Komulainen, and polo player Malcolm Borwick, one stroke ahead of a team led by Pauline Roussin-Bouchard.

Amateur wins
2016 Faldo Series Slovakia Championship
2017 Czech National Match Play Championship, Johnie Imes Invitational
2019 Las Vegas Collegiate Showdown
2020 River Landing Classic
2021 Chattanooga Classic, Ron Moore Invitational, Grandover Fall Classic

Source:

Team appearances
Amateur
European Girls' Team Championship (representing Czech Republic): 2015, 2016
European Ladies' Team Championship (representing Czech Republic): 2017, 2018, 2019, 2020, 2021

References

External links

Czech female golfers
Ladies European Tour golfers
East Tennessee State Buccaneers women's golfers
People from Šternberk
1998 births
Living people